Nupserha sexpunctata is a species of beetle in the family Cerambycidae. It was described by Chevrolat in 1857.

Varietas
 Nupserha sexpunctata var. impuncticollis Breuning, 1950
 Nupserha sexpunctata var. bipuncticollis Breuning, 1950

References

sexpunctata
Beetles described in 1857